Kalki is a 1996 Indian Tamil-language drama film written and directed by K. Balachander, starring Shruti, Rahman, Prakash Raj, Geetha, Renuka, Suvaluxmi and Fathima Babu. The film was released on 10 November 1996, and was dubbed into Telugu with the same name.

Plot 
Chellammaa (Geetha), a singer, is wedded to a chauvinistic, sadistic industrialist Prakash. She is unable to beget a child and hence is the target of hurting words from Prakash and his mother. When he prohibits her from singing, it is the last straw for her, and they divorce. Prakash marries Karpagam, a doormat wife, while Chellammaa stays single, with a cook named Kokila (newsreader Fathima Babu in her first movie appearance) around to help her. Kalki (Shruti) works in an ad agency and is relentlessly pursued by coworker and model Paranjothi (Rahman). She not only rejects him but also debunks love and sentiments. Chellammaa becomes friends with Kalki after a few encounters, and Kalki moves in as a paying guest. However, she strikes up a friendship with Prakash, and as the result of an affair with him, she ends up bearing his child. Kalki makes him understand what he was doing to his wife by treating him like the way he treats his wife. During the time of delivery, Karpagam, with her lawyer, threatens Prakash that she is going to divorce him. However, upon realising the mistakes that he did, he asks sorry to Karpagam and asks for a chance to change himself. She agrees with a condition not to hurt Kalki's child and also to live with Kalki. Prakash agrees to both the conditions. When they meet Kalki and inform this, Kalki says that she does not want to live with them as well as she is not ready to give the child to them. Before delivery, she meets Chellamma and informs that she did live with Prakash to teach him a lesson and had a child just for Chellamma and leaves the child with Chellamma after delivery. After that, the society is not ready to accept her, so she goes to Paranjothi, who is waiting for her and confesses her love for him.

Cast 
Shruti as Kalki
Rahman as Paranjothi
Prakash Raj as Prakash
Geetha as Chellamma
Renuka as Karpagam
Fathima Babu as Kokila
M. N. Rajam
Kathadi Ramamurthy
Priyadarshini as Kalki's friend
Thalaivasal Vijay
Vasuki
Mohan Raman as Shankaran
Baby Anu
K. S. Ravikumar as a lawyer (special appearance)
K. Balachander as a film producer (special appearance)
Suvaluxmi as an actress (special appearance)

Production 

.

Soundtrack 
The music was composed by Deva and lyrics were written by Ilandevan. The song "Poove Ne Aadava" is partly based on "Against Doctor's Orders" by Kenny G.

Accolades 
Shruti won the Filmfare Award for Best Actress – Tamil, and the Tamil Nadu State Film Award for Best Actress. Prakash Raj won the Tamil Nadu State Film Award for Best Villain.

References

External links 

1990s Tamil-language films
1996 drama films
1996 films
Films about women in India
Films directed by K. Balachander
Films scored by Deva (composer)
Films with screenplays by K. Balachander
Indian drama films